San Javier, Bolivia may refer to:

 San Javier, Ñuflo de Chávez, in Ñuflo de Chávez province, Santa Cruz department
 San Javier, Cercado, in Cercado province, Beni department